The 22nd Grey Cup was played on November 24, 1934, before 8,900 fans at Varsity Stadium at Toronto.

The Sarnia Imperials defeated the Regina Roughriders 20–12.

External links
 
 

Grey Cup
Grey Cup, 22th
Grey Cup
1934 in Ontario
November 1934 sports events
1930s in Toronto
Saskatchewan Roughriders